Vindication Swim is an upcoming biographical drama film about swimmer Mercedes Gleitze, who in 1927 became the first British woman to swim the English Channel. The film is written and directed by Elliott Hasler, starring Kirsten Callaghan in the lead role with John Locke playing her coach and Victoria Summer as a rival swimmer.

The film is produced by Relsah Films in association with Sea High Productions, Arden Entertainment and Picnik Entertainment. It is set for release in 2022.

Premise 
Vindication Swim depicts the story Mercedes Gleitze, who in 1927 became the first British woman to swim the English Channel. The film portrays Gleitze’s upstream struggle in overcoming both the cold waters of the English Channel and the oppressive society of 1920s England. However, after a rival comes forward claiming to have accomplished the same feat, Mercedes is forced into battle to retain her record and her legacy.

Cast 
 Kirsten Callaghan as Mercedes Gleitze
 John Locke as Harold Best
 Victoria Summer as Edith Gade
Douglas Hodge as The Newsreader
James Wilby as Mr. Havers
John Tolputt as Sir Arthur Coleridge
Sam Bullen as P.J. Templeton
Mike Skinner as Dr. H.W. Phillips 
 Matthew Wyn Davies as Corentin Charboneau
Anthony Arundell as Chairman Michael Read 
David Aitchison as Samuel Huntington 
 Owen Oldroyd as Office Manager
Justin Hayward as Leonard Clay
 Michael Cronin as Steamship Captain
 Melodie Tyrer as Gertrude Ederle
 Billy Reid as Pub Landlord
 Tim Loughton as William Joynson-Hicks

Production 
It was announced in 2018 that Hasler was writing a screenplay based around Mercedes Gleitze's 1927 attempt to become the first British woman to swim the English Channel, and that he intended for this to be his next project following the completion of his first feature WWII: The Long Road Home. John Locke was cast as Gleitze's coach, Harold Best, and sat in on auditions for the role of Gleitze. Kirsten Callaghan was cast as Mercedes Gleitze in June 2019.

Filming began on 12 August 2019 for the swimming sequences in the English Channel off the coast of Newhaven. At the end of September, filming of on-land exteriors and interiors took place across Sussex, which was delayed multiple times due to the COVID-19 pandemic. Filming locations include Brighton, Eastbourne, Lewes, Hastings and Worthing. Additional scenes were also shot in Birmingham. Filming eventually wrapped in June 2021.

In November 2020, it was reported by Deadline that actress Victoria Summer had joined the production as Edith Gade, a rival swimmer  who attempts to usurp Gleitze's record. In January 2022, Variety reported that actors Douglas Hodge and James Wilby had also joined the cast. The film is being scored by Daniel Clive McCallum.

Release 
In November 2022 Vindication Swim was screened at the historic Duke of York's Picturehouse in Brighton as part CINECITY Brighton Film Festival. The film was also nominated for best feature film at the Cardiff International Film Festival in October 2022.

The film is set for release in 2022.

References

External links 
 
 Vindication Swim on Relsah Productions
 Vindication Swim Official Site

Upcoming films
Upcoming English-language films
British biographical drama films
British black-and-white films
British feminist films
British historical drama films
British independent films
British sports drama films
Drama films based on actual events
Films partially in color
Films postponed due to the COVID-19 pandemic
Films set in the 1920s
Films set in 1927
Films set in England
Films set in London
Films set in Brighton